Serghei Covalciuc (born 20 January 1982) is a Moldovan-Ukrainian former footballer.

Career
He spent six seasons playing for Spartak Moscow in the Russian Premier League. Previously he played for Tiligul Tiraspol in Moldovan championship, having joined them in the 1999 pre-season. His contract with Spartak ended in 2009.

An Odessa native, Serghei Covalciuc previously had Moldovan and Transnistrian (de facto nation)  citizenships, but, in 2007, he renounced them to receive Romanian citizenship and be able to play more often for Spartak. On 23 February 2010, Tom Tomsk signed Covalciuc on a free transfer and on a two-year deal.

After playing for half-a-season for FC Zhemchuzhina-Sochi in the Russian First Division in 2011, Covalciuc transferred to his home-city team Chornomorets Odessa in the Ukrainian Premier League on 29 August 2011.

Position
He is a versatile player being able to play as an attacking midfielder (main position), second striker, defensive midfielder, winger, or full-back.

International career
Covalciuc made 41 appearances for the Moldovan senior squad, including three games in UEFA Euro 2008 qualifying. He also played eight games in 2006 FIFA World Cup qualification (UEFA) and was a member of 2002 edition.

He played his last official match against Turkey on 11 October 2006 before denaturalization of his Moldovan nationality. In 2012, he was recalled to the national team, making a further seven appearances.

International goals
Scores and results list Moldova's goal tally first.

Personal life
His brother Chiril Covalciuc is also a professional footballer and also plays for Chornomorets. Prior to that, they were together in Tom Tomsk as well.

References

External links
 Serghei Covalciuk's profile on Spartak Moscow website
Profile at FFU website 

1982 births
Living people
Moldovan footballers
Moldovan expatriate footballers
Moldova international footballers
FC Karpaty Lviv players
FC Spartak Moscow players
FC Chornomorets Odesa players
Russian Premier League players
Ukrainian Premier League players
Kazakhstan Premier League players
Moldovan people of Ukrainian descent
Expatriate footballers in Russia
Expatriate footballers in Ukraine
Moldovan expatriate sportspeople in Ukraine
Expatriate footballers in Kazakhstan
FC Tom Tomsk players
FC Zhemchuzhina Sochi players
FC Aktobe players
Association football midfielders